Resident Evil: Death Island is an upcoming Japanese adult computer-animated action horror film set in the same universe as the Resident Evil video games. It is the fifth installment and fourth film in the animated Resident Evil series, following the 2017 film Resident Evil: Vendetta and the 2021 miniseries Resident Evil: Infinite Darkness. It will be released in 2023.

Synopsis
"D.S.O. agent Leon S. Kennedy is on a mission to rescue Dr. Antonio Taylor from kidnappers, when a mysterious woman thwarts his pursuit. Meanwhile, B.S.A.A. agent Chris Redfield is investigating a zombie outbreak in San Francisco, where the cause of the infection cannot be identified. The only thing the victims have in common is that they all visited Alcatraz Island recently. Following that clue, Chris and his team head to the island, where a new horror awaits them."

Setting
According to Capcom, the film will take place in the year 2015. This places the film after the events of Resident Evil 6 (set in 2013) and Resident Evil: Vendetta (set in 2014), but before Resident Evil 7: Biohazard (set in 2017).

Production and release
On February 2, 2023, the film was announced by Sony Pictures Home Entertainment, with IGN posting an exclusive trailer for the film. IGN reported that the film will release in summer 2023, is directed by Eiichirō Hasumi, and is written by Makoto Fukami. Sony Pictures Home Entertainment will distribute the film worldwide, excluding Japan.

References

External links
  

Japanese adult animated films
Japanese animated horror films
Japanese animated science fiction films
Japanese computer-animated films
English-language Japanese films
Resident Evil films
Horror anime and manga
Anime films based on video games